Arthur Raymond may refer to:

 Arthur Emmons Raymond (1899–1999), aeronautical engineer
 Arthur W. Raymond, American football coach and player
 Bugs Raymond (Arthur Lawrence Raymond, 1882–1912), Major League Baseball pitcher